Rosa Kale (Rose Forest) is a 2008 Sri Lankan Sinhala drama mystery film directed by Nishantha Weerasingha and produced by Dhammika Siriwardena for Alankulama Films. It stars Indian actress Monika Maruthiraj and Roshan Ranawana in lead roles along with Sanath Gunathilake and Iranganie Serasinghe. Music co-composed by Rohana Weerasinghe and Bathiya and Santhush. It is the 1106th Sri Lankan film in the Sinhala cinema.

Initially cast with Pooja Umashankar for the lead role, she has withdrawn due to busy schedule for her previous films.

Plot
The film revolves around an orphanage run by a wealthy philanthropist in memory of his dead wife. Due to the bad management the orphanage faces a difficult time and this affects the children and discipline of the institution. Disappointed with the development Suriyabandara, the owner of the orphanage decides to close down it. Yet due to the request of his son and mother gives one more chance recruiting a new mistress to the place. And Nimsara a young beautiful girl takes up the post and 'Rosa Kele' shows the dramatic changes that take place in the institution.

Cast
 Monika Maruthiraj as Nimsara
 Roshan Ranawana as Akalanka
 Sanath Gunathilake as Mr. Sooriyabandara
 Iranganie Serasinghe as Akalanka's granny
 Anton Jude as Basil
 Kumara Thirimadura as Percy
 Nilanthi Wijesinghe as Matron
 Eddie Amarasinghe
 Chitra Warakagoda as Nimasara's mother
 Dinuli Mendis as Introductory Narrator
 Narada Bakmeewewa as himself
 Rozanne Dias as herself

Soundtrack

References

2008 films
2000s Sinhala-language films
2008 drama films
2000s mystery drama films
Sri Lankan drama films